Mani Ratnam an Indian film director, screenwriter and producer, who is well known for his work in Tamil cinema, based in Chennai, India. He entered the film industry through Pallavi Anu Pallavi, a Kannada film in 1983. The film fetched the Karnataka State Film Award for Best Screenplay for Ratnam. This was followed by a series of unsuccessful films such as Unaroo (Malayalam) and Pagal Nilavu (Tamil). However, it was after Mouna Ragam (1986) Ratnam established himself as a prominent film-maker in the Tamil film industry. The film earned him a National Film Award and a Filmfare Award for Best Tamil Director. Nayakan released in 1987, It won three National Film Awards at the 35th National Film Awards, further elevating his status. The film was India's official submission for the Academy Award for Best Foreign Language Film in 1988 at the 60th Academy Awards; however, it was not shortlisted among the final nominees. His next film Agni Natchathiram was commercially successful and won two awards each at the Filmfare Awards South and Tamil Nadu State Film Award ceremonies. In 1989 he made his Telugu language debut with Geethanjali which received the Golden Lotus Award for Best Popular Film and a Nandi Award to his credit. His "Terrorism trilogy" consisting of Roja (1992), Bombay (1995) and Dil Se.. (1998) were highly acclaimed and won numerous awards in India and film festivals abroad. Nayagan and Anjali (1990) were India's official entry for Oscars in the Best Foreign Language Film category. His Tamil film Nayagan along with Satyajit Ray's The Apu Trilogy and Guru Dutt's Pyaasa are the only Indian films to have appeared in Time magazine's All-Time 100 Greatest Movies.

The Government of India honoured Ratnam with the Padma Shri in 2002. Films like Roja, Bombay, Iruvar, Dil Se.. and Kannathil Muthamittal have been screened at many film festivals and fetched him international acclaim.

As of 2013, Ratnam has won six National Film Awards, four Filmfare Awards, six Filmfare Awards South, and numerous awards at various film festivals across the world.

Civilian Honours

Filmfare Awards

Filmfare Awards South

Karnataka State Film Awards

Nandi Awards

National Film Awards

Star Screen Awards

Tamil Nadu State Film Awards

Moscow International Film Festival

Edinburgh International Film Festival

Jerusalem Film Festival

Political Film Society Awards

Belgrade Film Festival

International Tamil Film Awards

Berlin Film Festival

RiverRun International Film Festival

Zimbabwe International Film Festival

Film Fest New Haven Awards

Westchester Film Festival

Indian Film Festival of Los Angeles

Venice International Film Festival

V. Shantaram Awards

Vijay Awards
Chevalier Sivaji Ganesan Award - Indian Cinema

References

External links
 Awards for Mani Ratnam. Internet Movie Database

Lists of awards received by Indian film director